The Frank E. and Katie (Cherveny) Zalesky House is a historic building located in Belle Plaine, Iowa, United States. Built around 1872, the 2½-story, brick house features a mansard roof with dormers, roof cresting, veranda-like porch, bracketed cornice, a two-story bay, and windows with heavy hoods. The Zalesky family were part of Belle Plaine's Bohemian immigrant community. That community included author, philosopher, teacher and journalist František Klácel who lived in this house at the end of his life under the Zalesky's care. The house was listed on the National Register of Historic Places in 2012.

References

Houses completed in 1872
Buildings and structures in Benton County, Iowa
National Register of Historic Places in Benton County, Iowa
Houses on the National Register of Historic Places in Iowa
Second Empire architecture in Iowa
Belle Plaine, Iowa